Abuko is a town in the West Coast Division of the Gambia, five miles southwest of the capital Banjul. 
It is located in the district of Kombo North/Saint Mary to the north of Banjul International Airport and Abuko Nature Reserve.

Location

It had 6,572 inhabitants as of 2012.
The area around Abuko is well-populated, with 1,056 people per square kilometer.
The town is home to the Abuko United FC.

The  Abuko Nature Reserve, created in 1968, lies to the south of the town.
It is the most visited tourist attraction in Gambia, with over 30,000 visitors annually.
It contains tropical canopy forest near the Lamin Stream, giving way to Guinean savanna further from the water.
The reserve is home to many species of bird, four primates and a variety of reptiles.

Terrain

The surrounding land is mainly flat.
The vegetation around Abuko is almost all fields.  
Peninsulas and islands are common in the region.

Climate

Abuko has a savanna climate. 

Notes

References

Populated places in the Gambia
Kombo North/Saint Mary